The Hoverla 2012–13 season is Hoverla's sixth Ukrainian Premier League season, and their second season under manager Oleksandr Sevidov. During the season Hoverla will compete in the Ukrainian Premier League and Ukrainian Cup.

Current squad
Squad is given according to Ukrainian Premier League official website of August 31, 2012.

Competitions

2012-13 Ukrainian Premier League

Results summary

Results by round

Results

League table

2012-13 Ukrainian Cup Results

Squad statistics

Goal scorers

Appearances and goals

|-
|colspan="14"|Players who appeared for Hoverla who left the club during the season:

|}

Disciplinary record

References

External links

Hoverla Uzhhorod
FC Hoverla Uzhhorod seasons